Walter Wilson (5 April 1843 – 9 June 1865) was a New Zealand cricketer. He played in two first-class matches for Canterbury from 1863 to 1865.

See also
 List of Canterbury representative cricketers

References

External links
 

1843 births
1865 deaths
New Zealand cricketers
Canterbury cricketers
People from Moradabad